Robert Legato (born 1956) is an American visual effects supervisor, second unit director, and second unit director of photography.

Raised in Asbury Park, New Jersey, Legato graduated from Ocean Township High School.

Career
He directed the 2016 film Eloise.

He has been nominated for five Academy Awards and has won three. His first win was for his visual effects work on Titanic, his second was for his work on Hugo and his third for The Jungle Book. In 1996, he won the BAFTA award for Best Achievement in Special Effects for Apollo 13, for which he also garnered his first Academy Award nomination. He won Academy Awards in Visual effects for Hugo and The Jungle Book. In 2020, he received his fifth Academy Award nomination for Best Visual Effects for The Lion King.

Prior to his work in film, he was a Visual Effects Supervisor for Star Trek: The Next Generation from 1987 to 1992, and Star Trek: Deep Space Nine in 1993. His work on the Star Trek franchise earned him three Emmy nominations and two wins, as well as an in-front-of-the-camera appearance on Reading Rainbow for an episode devoted to a behind-the-scenes look at TNG.

Legato is a member of the Directors Guild of America (DGA), American Society of Cinematographers (ASC) and the Visual Effects Society (VES).

Filmography

Television

References

External links
 
 
 
 
 

1956 births
Living people
Visual effects supervisors
Best Visual Effects Academy Award winners
Best Visual Effects BAFTA Award winners
Place of birth missing (living people)
Ocean Township High School alumni
People from Asbury Park, New Jersey